The first season of the Saint Seiya Omega anime series was produced by Toei Animation and aired on TV Asahi from April 1, 2012 to March 31, 2013. The season follow the adventures of Kōga, the newest wearer of the Pegasus Cloth in charge of protecting the goddess Athena alongside the 87 warriors known as Saints who defends Athena. He goes on a quest to battle the War God Mars and his army of Martians to protect Athena and the world from chaos.

The season is directed by Morio Hatano and written by Reiko Yoshida. Bandai Visual is collecting the series in both DVD and Blu-ray format with each volume containing four episodes. The first volume of Saint Seiya Omega was released on August 24, 2012. Two pieces of theme music were used for the season. The second opening theme, used for  beginning with episode 28, is  performed by Root Five.

Episodes

References

Omega
2012 Japanese television seasons
2013 Japanese television seasons